Jared Cole Oliva (born November 27, 1995) is an American professional baseball outfielder in the Los Angeles Angels organization. He has played in Major League Baseball (MLB) for the Pittsburgh Pirates.

Amateur career
Oliva attended Valencia High School in Santa Clarita, California. As a senior, he hit .325 with 11 stolen bases. Undrafted in the 2013 Major League Baseball draft, he enrolled at the University of Arizona where he walked on to the Arizona Wildcats baseball team.

Olvia redshirted his freshman year at Arizona in 2014. In 2015, as a redshirt freshman, he appeared in 43 games in which he hit .272 with one home run and twenty RBIs. That summer, he played in the Northwoods League for the Wisconsin Woodchucks. As a redshirt sophomore in 2016, he batted .239 with four home runs, 34 RBIs, and 13 stolen bases over seventy games. After the season, he returned to play in the Northwoods League. In 2017, his redshirt junior year, Oliva slashed .321/.385/.498 with four home runs and 54 RBIs in 59 games, earning All-Pac-12 First Team honors alongside earning a spot on the All-Pac-12 All-Defensive Team after posting a .985 fielding percentage. After the season, he was selected by the Pittsburgh Pirates in the seventh round of the 2017 Major League Baseball draft.

Professional career

Pittsburgh Pirates
Oliva signed with the Pirates for $200,000, and made his professional debut with the West Virginia Black Bears. Over 56 games, he hit .266 with 17 RBIs and 15 stolen bases. Oliva spent the 2018 season with the Bradenton Marauders, slashing .275/.354/.424 with nine home runs, 47 RBIs, and 33 stolen bases in 108 games. In 2019, he played with the Altoona Curve, batting .277/.352/.398 with six home runs, 42 RBIs, and 36 stolen bases over 123 games. After the season, he was assigned to the Peoria Javelinas of the Arizona Fall League, earning Fall All-Star honors.

On September 21, 2020, Oliva was selected to the 40-man and active rosters. He made his major league debut that day against the Chicago Cubs. He recorded his first hit, a single, on September 24 versus Alec Mills of the Cubs.

Olivia spent a majority of the 2021 season in the minor leagues with the Indianapolis Indians, batting .249 with two home runs and 23 RBIs over 64 games. He made forty at-bats for the Pirates with whom he hit .175 with two RBIs and two doubles. On March 31, 2022, Oliva was designated for assignment to make room for Josh VanMeter.

Los Angeles Angels
On December 7, 2022, he was claimed by the Los Angeles Angels in the minor league phase of the Rule 5 draft.

References

External links

1995 births
Living people
Sportspeople from Santa Clarita, California
Baseball players from California
Major League Baseball outfielders
Pittsburgh Pirates players
Arizona Wildcats baseball players
Wisconsin Woodchucks players
West Virginia Black Bears players
Bradenton Marauders players
Altoona Curve players
Indianapolis Indians players
Peoria Javelinas players
Yaquis de Obregón players
American expatriate baseball players in Mexico